Primera División A (Méxican First A Division) is a Mexican football tournament. This season was composed of Invieno 1999 and Verano 2000. Irapuato F.C. was the winner of the promotion to First Division after being champion in the two tournaments of the season.

Changes for the 1999–2000 season
Cuautitlán relocated to Puebla and renamed Lobos UAP.
Tigrillos relocated to Ciudad Juárez and renamed Tigres de Ciudad Juárez.
Ángeles de Puebla was a team created to occupy the place left by Puebla F.C. that remained in First Division after its owners bought the Union de Curtidores franchise.
Chivas Tijuana renamed Nacional Tijuana.
Alacranes de Durango was promoted from Second Division.

Stadiums and locations

Invierno 1999

Group league tables

Group 1

Group 2

Group 3

Group 4

General league table

Results

Reclassification series

First leg

Second leg

Liguilla

Quarter-finals

First leg

Second leg

Semi-finals

First leg

Second leg

Final

First leg

Second leg

Top scorers

Verano 2000

Group league tables

Group 1

Group 2

Group 3

Group 4

General league table

Results

Reclassification series

First leg

Second leg

Liguilla

Quarter-finals

First leg

Second leg

Semi-finals

First leg

Second leg

Final

First leg

Second leg

Top scorers

Relegation table

Promotion final
Irapuato F.C. gained the promotion to First Division directly, the team won the two tournaments corresponding to the season.

References

1999–2000 in Mexican football
Ascenso MX seasons